Sovereign Group is a Gibraltar-based corporate services company established in 1987. Sovereign's core business is setting up and managing tax-efficient structures to assist wealth management, foreign property ownership and cross-border business. The Sovereign Group has offices or agents in most major offshore and onshore financial centres worldwide.

The company mostly provides fiduciary services to high-net-worth individuals and their families, Sovereign's clients include expatriates, entrepreneurs and businesses of all sizes. Sovereign also offers a wide range of services that are natural adjuncts to their main activity, including retirement planning, asset management, financing, specialist tax advice and credit cards.

Howard Bilton, a tax lawyer, is the chairman of the Sovereign Group. Bilton was responsible for setting up the Sovereign Art Foundation which runs both the Sovereign Asian and European Art Prize, turning his art-collecting hobby into what is now Asia's largest art prize.

References

Financial services companies of Gibraltar
Companies established in 1987
1987 establishments in Gibraltar